Voyageur is the fifth studio album by the German musical project Enigma, released on 8 September 2003 by Virgin Records.

Voyageur was considered to be Enigma's most distinctive album to date, due to Enigma's drastic changes in sound as compared to the previous four albums. The project's signature shakuhachi flutes, Gregorian chants and tribal chants found on the earlier albums were all but gone on Voyageur. Instead, most of the songs found on the album were more pop-oriented, such as "Voyageur", "Incognito", "Boum-Boum" and "Look of Today"; the latter of which interpolates the chorus of ABC's "The Look of Love". Michael Cretu described Voyageur'''s genre as "sophisticated pop". Only a few samples of previous works are retained; a familiar reversed cymbal rhythm appears in "Look of Today", while "Incognito" contains the chorus of previous single "Sadeness" buried in the bridge of the song. The "Enigma foghorn" also appears at the opening of the record.

ReleaseVoyageur was released on the CD and cassette formats, while the CD cover art (done by Johann Zambryski) has two different versions:
A normal version with full paper inserts (which can be harder to find compared to the "special package" edition);
A "special package" edition with a transparent CD cover, with the album art printed on the inside of the CD case and partly on the CD itself, and a ring-shaped booklet placed under the CD.
In May 2018, the album received its first vinyl release as part of The Colours of Enigma series of reissues, which includes all other Enigma studio albums.

Track listing

Personnel
Credits adapted from the liner notes of Voyageur''.

 Ruth-Ann Boyle – lead vocals 
 Andru Donalds – lead vocals 
 Michael Cretu – lead vocals ; arrangements, engineering, production 
 Sandra Cretu – female voices
 Jens Gad – arrangements, engineering, guitars
 Johann Zambryski – artwork

Charts

Weekly charts

Year-end charts

Certifications

References

External links
 

2003 albums
Albums produced by Michael Cretu
Enigma (German band) albums
Virgin Records albums